Daniel Pereira dos Santos de Pina Cabral (Vila Nova de Gaia, 27 January 1924 – Porto, 23 June 2008) was a Portuguese Anglican bishop. He was the ninth Bishop of Lebombo, Mozambique, from 1968 to 1976. He was educated at the University of Lisbon and ordained in 1949.

Notes

External links 
 Texts on Bishop Daniel Pina Cabral in the website of the Lusitanian Church (Portuguese)

1923 births
2008 deaths
Portuguese Anglicans
University of Lisbon alumni
Anglican archdeacons in Africa
20th-century Anglican bishops in Africa
Anglican bishops of Lebombo
People from Vila Nova de Gaia
Portuguese expatriates in Mozambique